Hymenocallideae is a tribe (in the family Amaryllidaceae, subfamily Amaryllidoideae), where it forms part of the Andean clade, one of two American clades. The tribe was originally recognised by both Meerow (1995) and the Muller-Doblies' (1996). Its phylogenetic position within the Amaryllidoideae was established by Meerow et al. in 2000, while in-depth infratribal relationships were established in 2002.

Taxonomy 
The Müller-Doblies' (1996) considered this assemblage as a subtribe, Hymenocallidinae, of tribe Eucharideae, prior to Meerow and Snijman (1998) separating them into their own tribes.

Phylogeny 
The placement of Hymenocallideae within subfamily Amaryllidoideae is shown in the following cladogram, where this tribe is shown as a sister group to Clinantheae.

Subdivision 
Three genera:
 Hymenocallis Type
 Ismene
 Leptochiton

References

Bibliography

 
 
   (excerpts)

External links 

Amaryllidoideae
Asparagales tribes